AG 489 (or agatoxin 489) is a component of the venom produced by Agelenopsis aperta, a North American funnel web spider. It inhibits the ligand gated ion channel TRPV1 through a pore blocking mechanism.

To identify new inhibitors, capsaicin receptor channels (TRPV1) were screened from a venom library for activity against these channels. In result, the robust inhibitory activity was found in the venom. Venom fractionation utilizing a reversed phase HPLC  which led to the purification of the two acylpolyamine toxins, AG489 and AG505. Both of these inhibit the TRPV1 channels  from the extracellular membrane side. From the pore blocking mechanism, the pore mutations that change toxic affinity were identified. As a result, the four mutants decreased toxic affinity and several mutants increased it. Therefore, this was consistent with the scanned TM5-TM6 linker region  being the outer vestibule of the channels and further confirming that AG489 is a pore blocker.

See also 
 Agatoxin

References

External links 
 

Spider toxins